Alizée Crozet (born 3 October 2000) is a French figure skater. In the 2015–16 season, she became the French national senior bronze medalist and junior champion. She was selected to compete at the 2016 World Junior Championships in Debrecen, Hungary, where she qualified for the free skate and finished 21st.

Crozet trained at NBAA (Sandra Garde) Nice until the end of the 2015–16 season. In June 2016, she became a member of Patinage Artistique Briviste in Brive-la-Gaillarde and Pôle France in Bercy, Paris.

Programs

Competitive highlights 
CS: Challenger Series; JGP: Junior Grand Prix

References

External links 
 

2000 births
French female single skaters
Living people
People from Cagnes-sur-Mer
Sportspeople from Alpes-Maritimes